The Night Marchers are an American alternative rock band formed in 2007 in San Diego, California, United States. The band is composed of singer/guitarist John Reis, guitarist Gar Wood, bassist Tommy Kitsos, and drummer Jason Kourkounis. Reis, Wood, and Kourkounis had previously performed together in the Hot Snakes, while Kitsos previously performed with CPC Gangbangs. The Night Marchers' debut album See You in Magic was released in 2008 through Vagrant Records.

History
The Night Marchers were formed by singer/guitarist John Reis after the breakups of his previous musical acts. Reis had previously performed in numerous bands including Pitchfork (1986–1990), Drive Like Jehu (1990–1995), Rocket from the Crypt (1990–2005), Hot Snakes (1999–2005), and Sultans (2000–2007). After the breakup of the Sultans in January 2007 Reis took a break from performing, focusing on raising his new child, opening a recording studio and a bar, and running his record label Swami Records. He announced the formation of a new group in August 2007, including guitarist Gar Wood, bassist Tommy Kitsos, and drummer Jason Kourkounis. All of the members had previously been active in other bands: Wood had performed in Beehive and the Barracudas, Kitsos in CPC Gangbangs, and Kourkounis in The Delta 72. Wood and Kourkounis had also previously been members of the Hot Snakes with Reis. In The Night Marchers the members use pseudonyms that they had used with their previous acts. Reis goes by "Speedo", the name he had used in Rocket from the Crypt. Wood uses the stage name "Dner" which he had also used in Beehive and the Barracudas. Kitsos uses "Skitsos", which he had used in CPC Gangbangs. Kourkounis uses the pseudonym "Jsinclair", which he had also used in the Hot Snakes.

Reis described the sound of the new group as an amalgamation of his previous bands and influences:

He has also remarked that The Night Marchers' sound is more varied that his previous groups, since he no longer has multiple acts dividing his attention:

The band's debut album See You in Magic was released on April 22, 2008 through Vagrant Records. In an interview, Reis said: “With each year, your perspective gets a little bit broader. My appreciation for different sounds becomes more varied,” says Reis. “And I rely on that feeling to sustain my love and excitement when it comes to picking up an electric guitar. With the Night Marchers, I think our scope of influence is a little bigger than it was with Hot Snakes, who had a bigger scope of influence than Rocket from the Crypt.” 
Of the songwriting for See You in Magic, Reis said in an interview: “Some of the songs go back a couple years and a couple were written two days before,” Reis said. “It was kind of a large timeframe for me, because usually when you make a record, they’re all kind of part of the same idea that germinated over a two- or three-month period. Creativity for me is something that happens in brief moments where it just happens, and hopefully I’m lucky enough to have a guitar in my hands. It’s not like I can write a song everyday.”

Band members
John Reis – guitar, lead vocals
Gar Wood – guitar, backing vocals
Tommy Kitsos – bass guitar
Jason Kourkounis – drums

Discography

Albums

Singles

References

External links

Indie rock musical groups from California
Musical groups from San Diego
Musical groups established in 2007
Vagrant Records artists